Holger Hiemann (born 12 January 1968 in Karl-Marx-Stadt) is a retired German football player. He spent four seasons in the Bundesliga with Hamburger SV and VfL Wolfsburg.

References

External links
 

1968 births
Living people
German footballers
East German footballers
Chemnitzer FC players
Hamburger SV players
VfL Wolfsburg players
Bundesliga players
2. Bundesliga players
Sportspeople from Chemnitz
Association football goalkeepers
Footballers from Saxony